Cordelia Ainenehi Agbebaku (January, 1961 – February 16, 2017) was a Nigerian academic and former vice-chancellor of Ambrose Alli University.

Life
Agbebaku was born in Ekpoma in January, 1961. She studied law at Bendel State University now Ambrose Alli University, Ekpoma.
Agbebaku became the vice-chancellor of Ambrose Alli University (AAU) officially in 2014 when her appointment was confirmed by governor Adams Oshiomhole. She had been serving in an acting capacity from 2011 while serving as the dean of faculty of law.
Agbebaku died on February 16, 2017, at the University of Benin Teaching Hospital and is survived by children and husband -
professor Phillip Agbebaku of the department of political science in the university.

See also
List of vice chancellors in Nigeria

References

1961 births
2017 deaths
Vice-Chancellors of Nigerian universities
Women academic administrators
Nigerian women academics